The 2018 Kentucky Wildcats baseball team represents the University of Kentucky during the 2018 NCAA Division I baseball season. The Wildcats are a member of the Southeastern Conference. They are led by head coach Nick Mingione, who is in his second year at Kentucky.  The 2018 season marks the 50th and last season to play their home games at Cliff Hagan Stadium.  The Wildcats will open their new stadium on Alumni Drive for the 2019 season.

Roster

Schedule

! style="background:#0033A0;color:white;"| Regular Season
|- valign="top" 

|- bgcolor="#ccffcc"
| February 16 || ||8|| Russell C. King Field • Spartanburg, SC || W 6–1 || Hjelle (1–0) || Adams (0–1) || none || 857 || 1–0 ||
|- bgcolor="#ccffcc"
| February 17 || ||8|| Cleveland S. Harley Baseball Park • Spartanburg, SC || W 6–510 || Hjelle (1–0) || Adams (0–1) || none || 157 || 2–0 ||
|- bgcolor="#ccffcc"
| February 17 || ||8|| Cleveland S. Harley Baseball Park • Spartanburg, SC || W 10–3 || Lewis (1–0) || Van Der Weid (0–1) || none || || 3–0 ||
|- bgcolor="#ccffcc"
| February 18 || ||8|| Cleveland S. Harley Baseball Park • Spartanburg, SC || W 8–4 || McGeorge (1–0) || Ellis (0–1) || none || 145 || 4–0 ||
|- bgcolor="#ffbbbb"
| February 20 || ||8|| Cliff Hagan Stadium • Lexington, KY ||L 2–310||Schramm (1–0) || Ramsey (0–1) || none || 4,118 || 4–1 ||
|- bgcolor="#ccffcc"
| February 23 || ||8|| Cliff Hagan Stadium • Lexington, KY ||W 10–1||Hjelle (2–0)|| Lee (0–2)|| none || 3,154 || 5–1 ||
|- bgcolor="#ccffcc"
| February 24 ||Oakland ||8|| Cliff Hagan Stadium • Lexington, KY ||W 17–6||Thompson (1–0)||Parr (0–1)||none||2,508||6–1||
|- bgcolor="#ccffcc"
| February 25 ||Oakland ||8|| Cliff Hagan Stadium • Lexington, KY ||W 15–6||Lewis (2–0)||Bowers (0–2)||none||2,909||7–1||
|- bgcolor="#ccffcc"
| February 27 || ||6|| Cliff Hagan Stadium • Lexington, KY ||W 4–3||Haake (1–0)||Morrison (0–1)||none||3,240||8–1||
|-

|- bgcolor="#ccffcc"
| March 2 ||||6|| Minute Maid Park • Houston, TXShriners College Classic||W 14–2||Hjelle (3–0)||Cumbie (0–1)||none|| ||9–1||
|- bgcolor="#ccffcc"
| March 3 ||||6|| Minute Maid Park • Houston, TXShriners College Classic ||W 7–2||Thompson (2–0)||Wesneski (1–1)||none|| ||10–1||
|- bgcolor="#ccffcc"
| March 4 ||Louisiana||6|| Minute Maid Park • Houston, TXShriners College Classic||W 10–4||Lewis (3–0)||Perrin (0–3)||none|| ||11–1||
|- bgcolor="#ccffcc"
| March 6 || ||6|| Cliff Hagan Stadium • Lexington, KY ||W 16–6||Harper (1–0)||Teague (1–1)||none||2,800||12–1||
|- bgcolor="#ffbbbb"
| March 7 || ||6|| Cliff Hagan Stadium • Lexington, KY ||L 6–8||Williams (1–1)||Schaenzer (0–1)||Martin (1)||2,342||12–2||
|- bgcolor="#ccffcc"
| March 9 ||Texas Tech ||6|| Cliff Hagan Stadium • Lexington, KY ||W 11–6 ||Hjelle (4–0)||Harpenau (1–1)||Machamer (1)||2,568||13–2||
|- bgcolor="#ccffcc"
| March 10 ||Texas Tech ||6|| Cliff Hagan Stadium • Lexington, KY ||W 10–7||Maley (1–0)||Haveman (0–1)||none||2,811||14–2||
|- bgcolor="#ffbbbb"
| March 11 ||Texas Tech ||6|| Cliff Hagan Stadium • Lexington, KY ||L 3–5||Kilian (1–0)||Lewis (3–1)||Quezada (1)||2,643||14–3||
|- bgcolor="#ffbbbb"
| March 16 ||Arkansas ||4|| Baum Stadium • Fayetteville, AR ||L 4–9||Reindl (1–1)||Hjelle (4–1)||Cronin (3)||8,751||14–4||0–1
|- bgcolor="#ffbbbb"
| March 17 ||Arkansas ||4|| Baum Stadium • Fayetteville, AR ||L 2–14||Campbell (2–2)||Lewis (3–2)||none|| ||14–5||0–2
|- bgcolor="#ffbbbb"
| March 17 ||Arkansas ||4|| Baum Stadium • Fayetteville, AR ||L 9–16||Murphy (3–0)||Harper (1–1)||none||10,418||14–6||0–3
|- bgcolor="#ccffcc"
| March 20 || ||6|| J. Page Hayden Field • Cincinnati, OH ||W 20–4||Schaenzer (1–1)||Zwack (0–4)||none||159||15–6||
|- bgcolor="#ccffcc"
| March 23 || ||6|| Cliff Hagan Stadium • Lexington, KY ||W 5–4||Ramsey (1–1)||Coker (3–1)||none||3,158||16–6||1–3
|- bgcolor="#ffbbbb"
| March 24 ||Auburn ||6|| Cliff Hagan Stadium • Lexington, KY ||L 3–4||Malczewski (3–0)||Machamer (1–1)||Coker (4)|| ||16–7||1–4
|- bgcolor="#ccffcc"
| March 25 ||Auburn ||6|| Cliff Hagan Stadium • Lexington, KY ||W 13–3||Lewis (4–2)||Burns (2–3)||none||3,130||17–7||2–4
|- bgcolor="#ccffcc"
| March 27 ||||6|| Cliff Hagan Stadium • Lexington, KY ||W 13–7||Harper (2–1)||Wilson (0–1)||none||3,032||18–7||
|- bgcolor="#ffbbbb"
| March 30 ||Alabama||7|| Sewell–Thomas Stadium • Tuscaloosa, AL ||L 2–4||Finnerty (3–1)||Hjelle (4–2)||Medders (3)||4,421||18–8||2–5
|- bgcolor="#ffbbbb"
| March 31 ||Alabama ||7|| Sewell–Thomas Stadium • Tuscaloosa, AL ||L 2–4||Duarte (3–0)||Haake (1–1)||Medders (4)||4,403||18–9||2–6
|-

|- bgcolor="#ccffcc"
| April 1 ||Alabama||7|| Sewell–Thomas Stadium • Tuscaloosa, AL ||W 5–2||Lewis (4–2)||Guffey (1–1)||Machamer (2)||3,399||19–9||3–6
|- bgcolor="#ccffcc"
| April 3 ||||9|| Cliff Hagan Stadium • Lexington, KY ||W 8–5||Coleman (1–0)||Thompson (1–3)||Machamer (3)||4,798||20–9||
|- bgcolor="#ccffcc"
| April 6 ||South Carolina||9|| Cliff Hagan Stadium • Lexington, KY ||W 14–1||Hjelle (5–2)||Hill (3–3)||none||3,422||21–9||4–6
|- bgcolor="#ffbbbb"
| April 7 ||South Carolina||9|| Cliff Hagan Stadium • Lexington, KY ||L 1–15||Morris (6–2)||Haake (1–2)||Bridges (1)||2,642||21–10||4–7
|- bgcolor="#ccffcc"
| April 8 ||South Carolina||9|| Cliff Hagan Stadium • Lexington, KY ||W 10–5||Lewis (6–2)||Chapman (1–4)||Machamer (4)||2,853||22–10||5–7
|- bgcolor="#ccffcc"
| April 11 ||||8|| Hennon Stadium • Cullowhee, NC ||W 7–5||Coleman (2–0)||Therrian (0–3)||Machamer (5)||754||23–10||
|- bgcolor="#ccffcc"
| April 13 ||||11|| Foley Field • Athens, GA ||W 6–411||Machamer (2–1)||Locey (6–1)||none||3,004||24–10||6–7
|- bgcolor="#ffbbbb"
| April 14 ||Georgia||11|| Foley Field • Athens, GA ||L 7–9||Hancock (4–2)||Haake (1–3)||Webb (2)|| ||24–11||6–8
|- bgcolor="#ccffcc"
| April 15 ||Georgia||11|| Foley Field • Athens, GA ||W 1–0||Ramsey (2–1)||Webb (1–4)||Machamer (6)||3,218||25–11||7–8
|- bgcolor="#ffbbbb"
| April 17 ||Louisville ||6|| Jim Patterson Stadium • Louisville, KY ||L 2–8||Detmers (2–0)||Harper (2–2)||none||3,806||25–12||
|- bgcolor="#ffbbbb"
| April 19 ||Florida||6|| Cliff Hagan Stadium • Lexington, KY ||L 2–11||Singer (8–1)||Hazelwood (0–1)||none||3,646||25–13||7–9
|- bgcolor="#ffbbbb"
| April 20 ||Florida||6|| Cliff Hagan Stadium • Lexington, KY ||L 4–9||Kowar (7–1)||Hjelle (5–3)||none||4,174||25–14||7–10
|- bgcolor="#ccffcc"
| April 21 ||Florida||6|| Cliff Hagan Stadium • Lexington, KY ||W 3–2||Lewis (7–2)||Dyson (5–3)||Machamer (7)||4,461||26–14||8–10
|- bgcolor="#ccffcc"
| April 25 ||||13|| Cliff Hagan Stadium • Lexington, KY ||W 7–1||Coleman (3–0)||Rogers (0–1)||none||2,835||27–14||
|- bgcolor="#ccffcc"
| April 27 ||Missouri||13|| Cliff Hagan Stadium • Lexington, KY ||W 7–1||Hjelle (6–3)||Sikkema (3–4)||Machamer (8)||4,112||28–14||9–10
|- bgcolor="#ffbbbb"
| April 28 ||Missouri||13|| Cliff Hagan Stadium • Lexington, KY ||L 11–14||Plassmeyer (5–2)||Haake (1–4)||De Oca (1)||3,864||28–15||9–11
|- bgcolor="#ccffcc"
| April 29 ||Missouri||13|| Cliff Hagan Stadium • Lexington, KY ||W 11–10||Marshall (1–0)||De Oca (5–3)||Harper (1)||3,499||29–15||10–11
|-

|- bgcolor="#ffbbbb"
| May 4||Tennessee||13||Lindsey Nelson Stadium • Knoxville, TN ||L 2–6||Linginfelter (3–4)||Hjelle (6–4)||Crochet (1)||2,080||29–16||10–12
|- bgcolor="#ccffcc"
| May 5||Tennessee||13|| Lindsey Nelson Stadium • Knoxville, TN ||W 10–3||Haake (2–4)||Hunley (6–2)||none||1,912||30–16||11–12
|- bgcolor="#ffbbbb"
| May 6||Tennessee||13|| Lindsey Nelson Stadium • Knoxville, TN ||L 3–5||Crochet (5–5)||Lewis (7–3)||Stallings (1)||2,324||30–17||11–13
|- bgcolor="#ccffcc"
| May 8||Indiana||17||Bart Kaufman Field • Bloomington, IN ||W 7–6||Harper (3–2)||Saalfrank (1–3)||Machamer (9)||2,882||31–17||
|- bgcolor="#ccffcc"
| May 11||Mississippi State||17|| Cliff Hagan Stadium • Lexington, KY ||W 9–6||Hjelle (7–4)||Pilkington (2–6)||Machamer (10)||4,303||32–17||12–13
|- bgcolor="#ccffcc"
| May 12||Mississippi State||17|| Cliff Hagan Stadium • Lexington, KY ||W 4–1||Ramsey (3–1)||France (3–3)||none||4,416||33–17||13–13
|- bgcolor="#ffbbbb"
| May 13||Mississippi State||17|| Cliff Hagan Stadium • Lexington, KY ||L 8–18||Billingsley (4–3)||Schaenzer (1–2)||none||4,096||33–18||13–14
|- bgcolor="#ccffcc"
| May 15|| ||16|| Brooks Stadium • Paducah, KY ||W 14–2||Hazelwood (1–1)||Hayes (1–6)||none||1,056||34–18||
|- bgcolor="#ffbbbb"
| May 17|| ||19|| Hawkins Field • Nashville, TN ||L 1–8||Fellows (6–4)||Hjelle (7–5)||none||3,018||34–19||13–15
|- bgcolor="#ffbbbb"
| May 18||Vanderbilt ||19|| Hawkins Field • Nashville, TN ||L 1–5||King (1–3) ||Ramsey (3–2)||none||2,894||34–20||13–16
|- bgcolor="#ffbbbb"
| May 19||Vanderbilt ||19|| Hawkins Field • Nashville, TN ||L 6–9||Gillis (4–1)||Hazelwood (1–2)||Conger (1)||3,027||34–21||13–17
|-

|-
! style="background:#0033A0;color:white;"| Postseason
|-

|- bgcolor="#ffbbbb"
| May 22 || || || Hoover Metropolitan Stadium • Hoover, AL ||L 3–4||Greenhill (4–2)||Thompson (2–1)||none||5,514||34–21||0–1
|-

Record vs. conference opponents

References

Kentucky Wildcats
Kentucky Wildcats baseball seasons
Kentucky baseball